Brad Williams (born January 13, 1984) is an American stand-up comedian and actor who has appeared in numerous films and television shows. He was born with achondroplasia.

Early years
Williams was born with achondroplasia, a type of dwarfism. His condition plays a large part in the bits in both his stand-up comedy and television roles. He was a student at Sunny Hills High School in Fullerton, California and after graduation, he attended the University of Southern California but dropped out to pursue his acting and comedy career.

Comedy career
Williams got his start by attending a Carlos Mencia live comedy show. While he was in the crowd, Mencia made jokes about dwarves. The people sitting close to Williams were scared to laugh. Mencia noticed this, then noticed Williams and he asked him to join him on stage. Williams cracked a few jokes and impressed Mencia. Mencia then asked Williams to try stand-up and be his opening act on the road. Williams has been Mencia's opening act ever since, opening up shows on both the Mind of Mencia tour and the popular Punisher Tour.

In 2022, Williams was hired as the lead comic of the Las Vegas Cirque du Soleil show Mad Apple.

Television appearances
Williams appeared on Mind of Mencia, playing several roles, including playing a dwarf whore ("whorf"), the leader of an all dwarf basketball team, joining Mencia at a Renaissance faire, and giving a speech about his hatred of podiums. For St. Patrick's Day 2008, Brad, dressed as a leprechaun, made an appearance on The Tonight Show with Jay Leno. For Halloween 2008, Brad dressed up as Child's Play character Chucky for a skit on Jimmy Kimmel Live!.

Stand-up releases
In April 2011, Williams released his first full-length comedy album called Coming Up Short.

On April 14, 2014, Williams started hosting the About Last Night podcast with comedian/actor Adam Ray.

Williams had his first one-hour comedy special, Brad Williams: Fun Size, on May 8, 2015, on Showtime. His second one-hour comedy special, Brad Williams: Daddy Issues, aired on May 20, 2016, on Showtime.

Williams is a frequent guest and "friend of the show" to The Kevin and Bean Show, broadcast weekday mornings on KROQ 106.7FM, Los Angeles, California. He appeared on Kevin and Beans "April Foolishness" comedy show in 2012, 2013 and 2015 alongside such comedians as Bob Saget, Jay Mohr, Jim Jeffries, Bill Burr, and Eddie Izzard.

Personal life 
Williams has been confused with Jason "Wee Man" Acuña from Jackass because of their similar appearance.

Williams has also been confused with professional wrestler Dylan "Hornswoggle" Postl.

In 2017, Williams married Tae Kwon Do instructor Jasmine Gong. In January 2020, the couple had a daughter, who also is an achondroplastic dwarf.

In 2014, Williams made comments on the podcast Getting Doug with High during which he admitted to and described committing rape by deception. The episode was subsequently taken down, although clips of the episode reappeared on YouTube in 2019, prompting social media discussion about consent and widespread criticism of Williams’ actions. On January 14, 2020,  Williams tweeted an apology on Twitter where he stated that the story was fabricated and intended as a joke.

Discography

Filmography

Television

Film

References

External links
 
 
 About Last Night podcast

Living people
1984 births
Actors with dwarfism
American male comedians
American male film actors
American male television actors
21st-century American comedians
Comedians from California
Male actors from California
People from Orange, California